Hassan al-Hakim (1886 – March 30, 1982) was the Prime Minister of Mandatory Syria from September 12, 1941 until April 19, 1942 and again of the independent Syrian Republic from August 9, 1951 until November 13, 1951.

References

Citations

Sources 

 Commins, David Dean. Historical Dictionary of Syria, p. 119. Scarecrow Press, 2004, .

1886 births
1982 deaths
Prime Ministers of Syria
Syrian ministers of finance
Syrian Freemasons